PANLAR, the Panamerican League of Associations for Rheumatology is an association of Rheumatology professional bodies from member nations of North, Central and South Americas.

The Pan American League of Associations of Rheumatology (PANLAR), founded in 1943, gathers the scientific societies of rheumatology, health professionals related to rheumatic illnesses and rheumatic patient associations of all countries in the Americas.

The mission of PANLAR is to stimulate, promote and support research, prevention, treatment and rehabilitation of the rheumatic illnesses. The rheumatology field includes the rheumatic illnesses of the connective tissue, locomotive apparatus and musculoskeletical system.

PANLAR is organized through four geographical areas (1):

North Zone 
Canada, Mexico, United States

Central and Caribbean Zone 
Costa Rica, Cuba, Dominican Republic, El Salvador, Guatemala, Honduras, Nicaragua, Panama

Bolivarian Zone 
Bolivia, Colombia, Ecuador, Peru, Venezuela

Southern Cone Zone 
Argentina, Brazil, Chile, Paraguay, Uruguay

First Steps
In 1941, Dr. Aníbal Ruiz Moreno together with Dr. Fernando Herrera Ramos, submitted the idea of an ILAR regional league to Ralph Pemberton, then president of ILAR. In 1942, by request of Pemberton, the ARA accepted the proposal set forth by the South American doctors.(2)
A committee comprising doctors Russell Cecil, Robert Osgood, Ralph Boots, Loring Swain, Paul Holbrook and future Nobel Prize winner Philip Hench gave its final agreement and, soon afterward, with support from physicians in Canada, Chile, Brazil and Mexico, a path had been cleared to the creation of a society that grouped all rheumatologists in the continent. 
The committee suggested the creation of a provisional board to draw its charter, with Ruiz Moreno as president, Herrera Ramos as secretary, Richard Freyberg, from the U.S., as vice president and Wallace Graham, from Canada, as treasurer.

On May 31, 1944, after two years of hard work by the committee, the Pan-American League for the Study and Control of Rheumatic Disease came into existence. A few days later, its name would be changed to the Pan-American League Against Rheumatism (PANLAR). A month later, Loring T. Swain, the first person to hold the position of secretary, announced its foundation to the medical community in the U.S. and abroad. In a letter addressed to the editor of JAMA, he wrote: “On June 15, I received a letter from Dr. Aníbal Ruiz Moreno of Buenos Aires, who has been chosen as the provisional director of the PANLAR committee, duly signaling that our Pan-American league is a reality.” (3) 

PANLAR would become the first ILAR regional league. Its first president was Dr. Ralph Pemberton, who acted as such until his death in 1949. Dr. Ruiz Moreno followed suit between 1949 and 1953, while his friend Dr. Herrera Ramos headed the institution between 1955 and 1959. The first Pan-American Congress of Rheumatology was held in Rio de Janeiro and Sao Paulo in 1955 at the Copacabana, it featured an audience of 239 from 15 countries and provided an image of high quality and excellent organization.

PANLAR Today

PANLAR has experienced tremendous growth. It now operates in four regions with 21 member countries: North (Canada, USA and Mexico), Central America (Guatemala, Honduras, El Salvador, Nicaragua, Costa Rica, Panama, Dominican Republic, Cuba), Bolivarian (Venezuela, Colombia, Ecuador, Peru and Bolivia), and Southern Cone (Argentina, Brazil, Chile, Paraguay and Uruguay). Study groups were drafted during Antonio Reginato’s presidency in the first decade of the 21st century, and later the entity was organized as a 501(c)(3) nonprofit based in Atlanta (2014).(4)

The 2016–18 Executive Committee, headed by Dr. Carlo V. Caballero (Colombia), President-Elect Enrique Soriano (Argentina), Secretary General Carlos Lozada (U.S.) and Former President Carlos Pineda (Mexico), drafted a six-year (2016–22) development plan, approved by the Governing Board, the purpose of which is to stimulate excellence of rheumatology in the American continent and to advance the shared vision of becoming the main supplier of education and science, practice standards and rheumatology in Latin America. One pillar of this development plan is innovation (5,6).

The Association organizes an annual meeting and publishes sinde 2020 a new peer-reviewed journal Global Rheumatology by PANLAR (E-ISSN: 2709-5533). The Journal of Clinical Rheumatology became the official journal of the league since 2001. 
PANLAR it is a partner organisation of ILAR, International League of Associations of Rheumatology.

Presidents

1944 – 1949 RALPH PEMBERTON, (EEUU)

1949 – 1953 ANIBAL RUIZ MORENO, (Argentina)

1953 – 1955 RICHARD FREYBERG, (EEUU)

1955 – 1959 FERNANDO HERRERA RAMOS, (Uruguay)

1959 – 1963 WALLACE GRAHAM, (Canadá)

1963 – 1967 PEDRO NAVA, (Brasil)

1967 – 1970 RICHARD SMITH, (EEUU)

1970 – 1974 FERNANDO VALENZUELA, (Chile)

1974 – 1978 PINDARO MARTINEZ-ELIZONDO, (México)

1978 – 1982 OSVALDO GARCIA MORTEO, (Argentina)

1982 – 1986 LAWRENCE SHULMAN, (EEUU)

1986 – 1990 ADIL MUHIB SAMARA,(Brasil)

1990 – 1994 DUNCAN GORDON, (Canadá)

1994 – 1998 HUGO JASIN, Argentina (EEUU)

1998 – 2002 ABRAHAM GARCIA KUTZBACH, (Guatemala)

2002 – 2006 ANTONIO REGINATO,* Chile (EEUU)

2006 – 2008 JUAN ANGULO SOLIMANO, (Perú)

2008 – 2010 LUIS ESPINOZA, Perú (EEUU)

2010 – 2012 ANTONIO XIMENES (Brasil)

2012 – 2014 JOHN REVEILLE. (EEUU)

2014 – 2016 CARLOS PINEDA VILLASEÑOR (México)

2016 – 2018 CARLO VINICIO CABALLERO URIBE (Colombia)

2018 - 2020  ENRIQUE SORIANO (Argentina)

2020 - 2022 CARLOS LOZADA  (EEUU)

Panamerican Congresses

I   Río de Janeiro y Sao Paulo, Brasil 1955
II  Washington, EEUU 1959
III Viña del Mar 1963
IV  Ciudad de México 1967
V   Punta del Este, Uruguay 1970
VI  Toronto, Canadá 1974
VII Bogotá, Colombia 1978
VIII Washington, EEUU 1982
IX   Buenos Aires, Argentina 1986
X    Guadalajara. México 1990
XI   Recife, Brasil 1994
XII   Montreal, Canadá 1998
XIII  Aruba   2002
XIV   Lima Perú 2006
XV    Ciudad de Guatemala 2008
XVI   Santiago de Chile 2010
XVII  Punta Cana Rep. Dom. 2012
XVIII Punta del Este Uruguay 2014
XIX  Panamá, Panamá 2016
XX Buenos Aires, Argentina 2018

Annual Congress 

21 Quito , Ecuador 2019
22 Virtual 2020
23 Virtual 2021

External links
1. * PANLAR Website

2. * 

3 *

4 * Panlar New Directions  http://journals.lww.com/jclinrheum/Citation/2014/06000/The_New_Pan_American_League_of_Associations_for.6.aspx http://panlar.org/en/panlar-new-directions/ 

5* Caballero-Uribe CV. The History of PANLAR Throughout Its Evolution. J Clin Rheumatol. 2019 Jan;25(1):1-3. doi: 10.1097/RHU.0000000000000798. PMID: 29933326. 

6*PANLAR a través de su Historia. PANLAR 2018 (Libro)  http://www.panlar.org/historia
 Download book http://www.panlar.org/sites/default/files/historia_de_panlar_75_anos_digital.pdf

Rheumatology organizations